Marco Ilsø  is a Danish actor. His first acting role was as a 14-year-old, playing the lead in 24 episodes of Mikkel og guldkortet. Introduced in season 4, he played Hvitserk in Vikings.

Selected filmography
 Rebounce as Niclas (2011)
 The Absent One as young Ditlev (2014)
 Danny’s Doomsday as Lukas (2014)
 The Model as Frederik (2016)
 Uro as Kevin (2018)
 Wild Men as Simon (2021)
 The Islander as Neb (2022)

Selected television
 Vikings as Hvitserk (seasons 4–6)
 Mikkel og Guldkortet as Mikkel in 24 episodes (2008)
  as Mads (season 1)
 Borgen - Power & Glory as Villads (2022)

References

External links

https://www.lindbergmanagement.com/actor/marco-ilsoe/

Living people
Danish film actors
Danish television actors
1994 births